De Kotmadam is a classic Flemish comedy television series directed by Ronnie Commissaris and Wim Feyearts produced for Belgian television since 1991. The series is written by Jaak Boon and Frans Ceusters. Season 22 will be aired in fall 2015.

The series revolves around Jeanne Piens (Katrien Devos), who owns a small sweet shop in the centre of Leuven and rents out several rooms of her house to students studying in the city. She is a caring type and loves all her students. Her husband Jef Liefooghe (Mark Verstraete) works for the city's gardening department. Their friend Odilon Bonheur (Odilon Mortier), a naïve warden in the local prison, visits regularly to give or seek help.

Odillon Mortier decided not to perform in season 21 due to health reasons. That's why Heman Verbruggen got a new role in the season: Gijs, a clumsy colleague of Jef. As Mortier suddenly died on 13 August 2012, Verbruggen will also act in future seasons but he is not part of the main cast.

Main characters

Jeanne
Jeanne pretends to be better than she is and brags frequently. If one of her customers goes on a vacation abroad or is going to ride the horses, she wants to do similar things. Her attempts mostly fail, but eventually, she wins (or at least thinks she has the upper hand) as she forges evidence. During her trip to Spain, she just hid in her own house and went to a solarium. In another example Mimi was on television getting flowers from her grandchild in some fictional "Thank you"-program. A jealous Jeanne also wanted to receive flowers. As the students were too busy, she just pretended to be an 18-year student, called Mieke, who wants to thank Jeanne as being the best landlady in town. Mieke was selected by the producers, but things got complicated when the producer wanted Mieke and Jeanne in the same scene. Furthermore, Jeanne exaggerates and misinterprets things. She once followed a course Chinese when one of her students was dating the daughter of the Chinese ambassador. It turned out the father ran a restaurant with a similar name. In another episode, Jeanne wanted to have a liposuction but due to some miscommunication, she got a piercing in her belly. In another episode she pretended to be a talented piano player - specialized in Sergei Rachmaninoff-compositions so she got an invitation to perform at the opening of an art exhibition. By coincidence, she was bitten by a ferret. She then had a reason to cancel the performance. Jeanne mostly wears old fashioned floral dresses.

Jef
Jef is lazy. He hates working. All small jobs are delayed. He can always persuade Odillon to do the task. Jef likes fishing and three-cushion billiards. He wants to be in the committee of both, in which he does not succeed. Despite he hates his job as city's gardener, he loves his own greenhouse where he cultivates some rare plants and flowers. Jef frequently takes a day off or calls his boss pretending to be sick. In such cases, he sneakily goes fishing telling Jeanne he is going to work. Although his lies work initially, Jeanne always retrieves the truth. Jef does not like his mother-in-law and vice versa. Jeanne's mother but regularly calls about her disorders. Jef mostly wears a white shirt, pants with suspenders and a small back brace. Similar as Jeanne, he forges evidence: he once won the national championship fishing, but he bribed the committee by putting a big zander on the hook. At some other game, he put fish in his living some hours before. In another example he did not had enough saving money to go on a fishing trip so he set up a fake charity event and sold waffles for "a friend who suffers cancer".

Odillon
Odillon is not that smart, but he is rather handy. He is well befriended with Jef and both like fishing and playing three-cushion billiards. He likes to fix the small jobs Jef delays. Jef always makes something up to sneak away and tells Odillon what he is going to do and what he will tell Jeanne. Odillon can't lie, so eventually he always spills the real story to Jeanne. Odillon is frequently asked by the students to help them, but it is always for their own purposes. Odillon does not realize he is being abused. Odillon was last seen in last episode of season 20 (episode 294).

Gijs
Gijs was introduced in the first episode of season 21. He has more or less the same personality as Odillon, except Gijs is clumsy whereas Odillon was rather handy.

Students
Most of the stories in the show revolve around the antics of the four students (there were 5 students until season 16). Because students can't realistically keep studying for more than a couple of years, there is high character turnover among the students. There is, however, some consistency in the stereotypicality of the characters. The last name of some characters was never revealed:
The hard-working, arrogant, know-it-all (M/F): Charles-Victor Blomme, Ria Vranckx, Gentil Aelvoet, Filip, Victor Kindermans
The fun-loving social type (M): Billy, Jo Van Der Gucht, Dieter, Hugo, Lukas, Stef, Lukas ((There were two different students with a name Lukas))
The shy insecure type (M): Koen Maertens, Bas, Arnold
The secure, responsible type (F): Sam De Taeye, Pim Davignon, Lus Hazevoets, Brigitte Ghoetseels, Saskia Moeremans, Paulien Billen, Martha
The fashionable outgoing boy-magnet (F): Betty Billen, Veronique, Tineke Creemers, Lies, Jill Verhaest, Ines

Customers
The sweet shop had one regular client: Bertje (Din Meysmans), a mischievous but well-meaning neighbourhood boy during the first four series. He was part of the main cast. As from season five, he was replaced by some other children, such as Jelle Cleymans, but none of them were considered to be in the main cast anymore.

Another important customer was Madame Hulpiau (Rita Smets) (season 3–14). Furthermore, Mimi (Machteld Ramout), a middle-aged woman who loves gossiping and is Jeanne's best friend, visits the shop regularly (season 4 – ongoing).

Other customers are Jeanne's previous colleagues. Jeanne was a cashier in a supermarket before she became manager of her own shop. She now looks down at her former colleagues and considers them as part of the lower class.

Current main cast
Katrien Devos - Jeanne Piens (1991–)
Mark Verstraete - Jef Liefooghe (1991–)
Machteld Ramout - Mimi Seghaert (1995–)
Frederik Huys - Victor Kindermans (2007–)
Helle Vanderheyden - Martha (2013–)
Anouk Luyten - Ines (2013–)
Arno Moens - Simon (2022-)

Current supporting cast
Gerd De Ley - Jos Dockx (2001–ongoing)
Serge Adriaensen - Sander / Rudi / Pol / Tuur (plays multiple characters from 2005-ongoing)
Ron Cornet - Gilbert (2009-ongoing)
Fred Van Kuyk - Gerard / Staff (1996–2005), (2013)

Former main cast
Pieter-Jan De Smet - Charles-Victor Blomme (1991–1994)
Tom Van Landuyt - Billy (1991–1993)
Anne Denolf - Sam Detaeye (1991–1996)
Din Meysmans - Bertje (1991–1996)
Aron Wade - Koen Maertens (1991–1997)
Geert Hunaerts - Jo De Becker (1994–1997)
Odilon Mortier - Odilon Bonheur (1991–2012)
Tine Van den Brande - Veronique (1995–1996)
Danaë van Oeteren - Pim Davignon (1996–1997)
Nicoline Dossche - Lus Haezevoets (1996–2000)
Bert Van Poucke - Hugo (1997–2002)
Steve Geerts - Dieter (1997–2001)
Pepijn Caudron - Gentil Van Aelvoet (1998–2001)
Esther Leenders - Tinneke Creemers (1998–2002)
Fabrice Delecluse - Lukas (1998–2002)
Louis Van Derwaal - Bas (2001–2004)
Margot Brabants - Brigitte Ghoetseels (2001–2004)
Marianne Devriese - Lies (2002–2006)
Mount Uyttersprot - Filip De Fossiel (2002–2006)
Mieke Dobbels - Saskia Moerman (2004–2009)
Jan Van Hecke - Arnold (2004-2009)
Christel Van Schoonwinkel - Betty Billen (1991–1994, 1996–1998, 2010)
Britt van der Borght - Ria Vranckx (1994–1998, 2012)
Han Coucke - Stef + (2003–2006, 2012)
Ayesha Künzie - Jill Verhaest (2007–2012)
Sarah Van Overwaelle - Paulien Billen (2010–2012)
Stoffel Bollu - Lukas (2010–2018)

Former supporting cast
Rita Smets - Madame Hulpiau (1993–2005)
Bram Van den Driessche - Ivan (1994–1995)
Jelle Cleymans - Pieter (1997)
Jos Van Gorp - Flor (1997–2010)
Gunter Reniers - Evert (2002–2004)
Felix Peeters - Vic (2003–2004)
Sjarel Branckaerts - Robert / Fernand / Gerard / Marcel (played multiple characters between 2003–2007)

Locations 
Filming is done in a limited set of locations: 
 the living room which is in the same room as the dinner and kitchen
 the 5 bedrooms of the students. As from season 16 there were only 4 student rooms. The room in the attic is a common recreation room for the students since then.
 the bedroom of Jef and Jeanne
 the sweet shop
 the common bathroom
 the entrance corridor of the private parts
 the veranda, where Jef cultivates his plants, and a small garden behind
 some scenes are filmed on the stairs or in front of the building

In rare situations other locations are used. In one episode Jeanne was selected to act in the Flemish version of Idols. In another episode, Jef was a participant in the Flemish variant of Wheel of Fortune.

Trivia
De Kotmadam is the longest-running Belgian sitcom in terms of episodes and seasons. FC De Kampioenen ended after 273 episodes and 21 seasons. De Kotmadam already had 274 episodes during mid-season 19. In terms of audience measurement, F.C. De Kampioenen breaks all records with an average of 1.2 million viewers, De Kotmadam at its peak in the 1990s had an average of 1.7 million viewers, these days the new episodes average 650.000.
Herman Verbruggen played the role of Marc Vertonghen in F.C. De Kampioenen. After last show stopped, he got the role of Gijs in De Kotmadam.
A running gag in the series are some friends and colleagues of Jef. Jef frequently talks about them. Some of them do actually turn up in the show, but the roles are always played by the same actor.
The overall storyline has lots of logical errors and contradictions.  In season 13 Jef and Jeanne are married for 25 years. In season 24 they are married 30 years. In an episode in season 18 Jeanne clearly knows what a transgender is, in season 24 she asks explanation at one of her students. In some episodes Jef and Jeanne have (basic) knowledge of English language, in other other episodes they do not understand English at all. The last name of Odilon was revealed in season 1 episode 14 where Jef addressed him as Odilon Michiels. However, the next time his last name was mentioned, was in season 3 episode 8 in a letter to queen Paola. As from this episode, Odilon his last name is Bonheur.
Jeanne her mother suffers hypochondriasis and frequently calls about her (feigned) health issues. It took until last episode of season 24 she actually turned up in the series, a role played by Alice Toen.

External links

References

Flemish television shows
Belgian television sitcoms
Fictional shopkeepers
Television shows set in Belgium
1991 Belgian television series debuts
VTM (TV channel) original programming